La Raulito (Little Ralph) is a 1975 Argentine film directed by Lautaro Murúa and written by Rocío Dúrcal, Manuel Alexandre and Rafaela Aparicio.

In a survey of the 100 greatest films of Argentine cinema carried out by the Museo del Cine Pablo Ducrós Hicken in 2000, the film reached the 18th position.

Synopsis
The film tells the story of a real life fan of Boca Juniors football club, María Esther Duffau, who as a teenage girl adopted the identity of a man in order to survive on the streets of Buenos Aires.

The film shows the teenage Raulito wandering between a reformatory for juvenile offenders, prison and psychiatric hospital. Raulito manages to escape, and finds work at Constitución railway station in Barrio Constitución. Raulito meets up with another street child and they become close friends. They both eventually manage to escape to Mar del Plata.

Release
The film premiered in Argentina on 10 July 1975.

Cast
The cast list (in alphabetical order) was:

Adriana Aizemberg
Martín Andrade
Christina Banegas
Roberto Carnaghi
Pablo Cedrón
Mónica Escudero
Zulema Katz
Virginia Lago
Juanita Lara
Anita Larronde
Carlos Lasarte
Mario Luciani
Jorge Martínez
Duilio Marzio
Fernanda Mistral
Irene Morack
Ana María Picchio
Luis Politti
Marilina Ross
Blanquita Silván
Nelly Tesolín
María Vaner

Miscellaneous
A follow up film was released in Spain in 1976, La Raulito Released, starring Charo López with a screenplay by Eduardo Barreiros and Eduardo Mignogna. The real life La Raulito, Mary Esher Duffau, died at the age of 74 on 30 April 2008, on the same day Boca Juniors played a Copa Libertadores match against the Brazilian club Cruzeiro Esporte Clube, with the players and fans observing a minute's silence in her remembrance.

See also
Boca Juniors

References

External links

1975 films
Argentine drama films
1970s Spanish-language films
Films shot in Buenos Aires
Films set in Buenos Aires
1970s Argentine films